Events in the year 1898 in Bulgaria.

Incumbents

Events 

 The Bulgarian News Agency was founded

References 

 
1890s in Bulgaria
Years of the 20th century in Bulgaria
Bulgaria
Bulgaria